Pangolakha Wildlife Sanctuary (Pron: pǽngólɑ́kha, Nepali: पाङ्लखा) is a wildlife reserve in the Pakyong District of the state of Sikkim in India. The total notified area of the park is around  while inside the wildlife sanctuary there are a few hamlets: Aritar, Dakline Lingtam, Phadamchen, Dzuluk, Gnathang Monastery Kupup. This wildlife sanctuary is linked to the forests of Neora Valley National Park of West Bengal as well as forests of Samtse, Bhutan and Haa district Bhutan. The area that comes under this biosphere has been declared in 1999 as a wildlife sanctuary under biogeographic province category 2C.

Geography
Pangolakha range in the east separates Sikkim from its eastern neighboring country Bhutan, whereas it is linked through forest patches to the south with Neora Valley National Park in West Bengal.
Some high altitude lakes are present there, including Lake Tsongmo, which act as a biodiversity hotspot for migratory birds. Rivers and their tributaries from the north are frozen from December to March; whereas they all flow with an enormous volume of water during the rainy season from mid-April to mid-October. Rangpo River and Jaldhaka River are the major rivers originating from the nearby lakes, which occur in this sanctuary.

Biodiversity

This wildlife sanctuary supports a large variety of species, since it falls at the junction of the Palearctic realm and the Indomalayan realm. As a Biogeographic Province, this wildlife sanctuary comes under 2C category.

Ecoregions and biomes

Inside this wildlife sanctuary, the primary ecoregions and their corresponding biomes are:
 Terai-Duar savanna and grasslands of the tropical and subtropical grasslands, savannas, and shrublands biome,
 Eastern Himalayan broadleaf forests of the tropical and subtropical moist broadleaf forests biome,
 Himalayan subtropical pine forests of the tropical and subtropical coniferous forests biome,
 Eastern Himalayan subalpine conifer forests of the temperate coniferous forests biome, and
 Eastern Himalayan alpine shrub and meadows of the montane grasslands and shrublands biome

All of these are typical of the Bhutan - Nepal - India hilly region.

Fauna

Birds in Pangolakha Wildlife Sanctuary include kalij pheasant, Oriental honey buzzard, blood pheasant, white-crested laughingthrush, striated laughingthrush, chestnut-crowned laughingthrush, bar-throated minla, red-tailed minla, white-browed shrike babbler, white-browed fulvetta, rufous sibia, whiskered yuhina, stripe-throated yuhina, rufous-vented yuhina, brown dipper, rusty-flanked treecreeper, dark-rumped rosefinch, little bunting. It is also home for some rarities like the speckled wood pigeon and bay woodpecker.

Mammals Some of the exotic species from North-East India are present in this wildlife sanctuary. The red panda, the state mammal of Sikkim and one of the most elusive creatures from northern forests lives here. Asiatic black bear, yellow-throated marten, takin and red fox are also present in this wildlife sanctuary. Some very commonly seen mammals in this sanctuary are the Himalayan striped squirrel and hoary-bellied squirrel of the Callosciurus genus.

Sightings of a Bengal tiger in the Sanctuary has been reported through two images captured by camera traps laid by the forest Officials. The camera captured two images of the tiger on the night of 6 December 2018 - at 6.23 pm and at 7 pm, near Goru Jurey, at an altitude of 9,583 feet, according to the DFO of the region. The official also stated that there had been oral narratives of tigers freely roaming in the forests of Sikkim until the late 1980s.
And in January 2019, the camera also recorded a snow leopard in the same spot. This very elusive and shy animal had earlier been captured on camera in the northern and western parts of Sikkim. However, this is the first photographic capture of a snow leopard in East Sikkim.

This image capture of both the Bengal tiger and the snow leopard in exactly the same location confirms the overlap in the migratory routes used by the two big cats inside Pangolakha, having migrated from the neighbouring Neora Valley National Park of West Bengal, according to a report by the Divisional Forest Officer.

The State Forest Department has set up Eco-Development Committees (EDCs) around all wildlife protected areas. In this IBA, EDCs have been set up in the villages of Mankhim, Dalepchand, Lingtam, Phadamchen, Zuluk and Gnathang.

See also
 Chapramari Wildlife Sanctuary
 Gorumara National Park
 Kyongnosla Alpine Sanctuary

References

External links
Forests, Environment & Wildlife Management Department | Government of Sikkim

Wildlife sanctuaries in Sikkim
 Pakyong district
Protected areas established in 1999
1999 establishments in Sikkim